Justice Randolph may refer to:

Joseph Fitz Randolph (1803–1873), associate justice of the New Jersey Supreme Court
Michael K. Randolph (born 1946), chief justice of the Supreme Court of Mississippi